Tibbets, a variant spelling of Tibbetts, is an English-language patronymic surname from the given names Tebald or Tibalt. Notable people with the name include:

 Daniel Tibbets, American media executive
 Eliza Tibbets (1823–1898), introduced seedless navel oranges to California; wife of Luther C. Tibbets
 Jane Tibbets: see List of Joseph Smith's wives
 Luther C. Tibbets (1820–1902), introduced seedless navel oranges to California; husband of Eliza Tibbets
 Paul Tibbets (1915–2007), American military officer; pilot of the airplane that dropped the atomic bomb on Hiroshima

See also 
 
 Tibbetts

References 

English-language surnames
Patronymic surnames